is a single by Japanese entertainer Akina Nakamori. Written by Chinfa Kan and Naoya Matsuoka, the single was released on May 1, 1985, by Warner Pioneer through the Reprise label.

Background 
"Akaitori Nigeta" was originally planned as Nakamori's 11th single, but producer Yūzō Shimada rejected it, as he felt the lyrics lacked the impact to be released as a single. As a result, the lyrics were reworked into what became "Meu amor é...". With the success of "Meu amor é...", "Akaitori Nigeta" was released as a 12" EP. The single was re-released on December 21, 1985 with a different jacket cover to coincide with the release of Nakamori's mini-album My Best Thanks.

Chart performance 
"Akaitori Nigeta" became Nakamori's eighth No. 1 on Oricon's weekly singles chart and sold over 353,700 copies.

Track listing

Charts

References

External links 
 
 
 

1985 singles
1985 songs
Akina Nakamori songs
Japanese-language songs
Songs with lyrics by Chinfa Kan
Warner Music Japan singles
Reprise Records singles
Oricon Weekly number-one singles